Srećko Juričić (born 30 December 1954) is a Croatian former professional footballer, who is currently the sporting director for HNK Rijeka.
Juričić has also had a career as a manager coaching: HNK Rijeka, Koper, Primorje, HIT Gorica, Istra, Al-Riffa, Ittihad Kalba, Al-Ahli Dubai, Sharjah FC, Qatar SC, Al Wasl FC, Al-Taawoun FC and national teams UAE, UAE U-20, Bahrain, Oman and Yemen.

Playing career

Club
As a player, he was part of HNK Rijeka's golden generation which won the Yugoslav Cup in 1978 and 1979. He is also Rijeka's most capped player with 684 caps. Juričić has captained the team both against Juventus in 1980 and Real Madrid in 1984.

Managerial career
In his managerial career he has led HNK Rijeka and Al-Ahli Dubai. Internationally he has coached the Bahrain national football team, Oman national football team, United Arab Emirates national football team and Yemen national football team. He then moved to coach the Bahrain Riffa Club.

As a manager Juričić led HNK Rijeka to the 1994 Croatian Cup Final where they lost to Croatia Zagreb.

On 4 October 2008, it was announced that Juričić has moved back to the UAE to coach Al Wasl FC.

In June 2009, he was appointed as manager of Yemen national football team. In December 2010, he was sacked after a string of poor results at the 2010 Gulf Cup of Nations which Yemen hosted.

In March 2012, Juričić was appointed director of sports in his first club HNK Rijeka.

Career statistics

Player statistics

Notes

Source Srečko Juričić statistics, NK Rijeka Seasons

Managerial statistics

Honours

Player
NK Rijeka
Yugoslav Cup: 1978, 1979
Balkans Cup: 1978
Yugoslav Second League: 1973-74

Individual
NK Rijeka all time XI

Manager
NK Primorje Ajdovščina
MNZ Nova Gorica Cup: 1991–92

Riffa SC
Bahraini Premier League: 1997-98
Bahraini King's Cup: 1998

Al-Ittihad Kalba SC
UAE Division One: 1998-99

Al-Ahli Dubai
UAE President's Cup: 2002

Bahrain
Gulf Cup of Nations Silver Medal: 2003

References

External links

Nk primorje

1954 births
Living people
Footballers from Rijeka
Association football defenders
Yugoslav footballers
HNK Rijeka players
K.R.C. Genk players
Yugoslav First League players
Challenger Pro League players
Yugoslav expatriate footballers
Expatriate footballers in Belgium
Yugoslav expatriate sportspeople in Belgium
Yugoslav football managers
Croatian football managers
2004 AFC Asian Cup managers
FC Koper managers
NK Primorje managers
HNK Rijeka managers
ND Gorica managers
NK Istra managers
Riffa SC managers
Al-Ittihad Kalba SC managers
United Arab Emirates national football team managers
Al Ahli Club (Dubai) managers
Bahrain national football team managers
Oman national football team managers
Al-Sharjah SCC managers
Al-Arabi SC (Qatar) managers
Qatar SC managers
Al-Wasl F.C. managers
Yemen national football team managers
Al-Taawoun FC managers
Croatian expatriate football managers
Expatriate football managers in Slovenia
Croatian expatriate sportspeople in Slovenia
Expatriate football managers in the United Arab Emirates
Croatian expatriate sportspeople in the United Arab Emirates
Expatriate football managers in Bahrain
Croatian expatriate sportspeople in Bahrain
Expatriate football managers in Oman
Croatian expatriate sportspeople in Oman
Expatriate football managers in Qatar
Croatian expatriate sportspeople in Qatar
Expatriate football managers in Yemen
Croatian expatriate sportspeople in Yemen
Expatriate football managers in Saudi Arabia
Croatian expatriate sportspeople in Saudi Arabia
HNK Rijeka non-playing staff